Deborah Reynolds was a Democratic member of the New Hampshire Senate, representing the 2nd District from 2006 to 2010.  She was Chairman of the New Hampshire Senate Judiciary Committee and served on the Commerce, Labor and Consumer Protection Committee, Rules and Enrolled Bills Committee, and the Ways and Means Committee.  She is one of five governor-appointed commissioners on the New Hampshire Commission for Human Rights.

The Senate District 2 comprises Alexandria, Ashland, Bath, Benton, Bridgewater, Bristol, Campton, Canaan, Center Harbor, Dorchester, Easton, Ellsworth, Groton, Haverhill, Hebron, Holderness, Landaff, Lyme, Meredith, Monroe, New Hampton, Orange, Orford, Piermond, Plymouth, Rumney, Sanbornton, Thornton, Warren, Wentworth and Woodstock.

References

External links
Follow the Money - Deborah R Reynolds
2006 campaign contributions

Democratic Party New Hampshire state senators
Living people
Women state legislators in New Hampshire
Year of birth missing (living people)
People from Plymouth, New Hampshire
21st-century American women